Crousi is the name of a Thracian tribe. They are mentioned by Dionysius of Halicarnassus.

References

See also
Thracian tribes

Ancient tribes in Thrace
Ancient tribes in the Balkans
Thracian tribes